Shenzhen railway station (formerly Shum Chun station), also unofficially known as Luohu railway station, is located across from Luohu Commercial City in Nanhu Subdistrict, Luohu District of Shenzhen, Guangdong and is the southern terminus of the Guangshen Railway.

It is one of two stations with high-speed rail service in Luohu District. The other station is Luohu North railway station, which is currently under construction on Shenzhen–Shanwei high-speed railway.

History
Shenzhen railway station was first opened as Shum Chun, as the last stop of the Chinese section of the Kowloon–Canton Railway on 8 October 1911. This station situated in Dongmen, in what was then the market town of Shenzhen/Shum Chun. It was relocated near its current location on the China-Hong Kong border, opposite Lo Wu station, in 1950. This station was in turn demolished in 1983 and successively rebuilt and remodelled multiple times to its current scale.

Location
The station is located just north of the boundary with Hong Kong in a north–south alignment. The Guangshen Railway joins the East Rail line in Hong Kong just south of the station, where Lo Wu station on the Hong Kong MTR is located. The Shenzhen Metro system has Luohu station nearby on a lower level connected with Shenzhen railway station.

Layout

Train services
Shenzhen railway station will be the main hub for inter-city trains in Guangdong Province, for example, and its current long-distance trains to Beijing, Shanghai, Chengdu, Guilin and Fuzhou will be relocated to Shenzhen East railway station in the future. Current high-speed trains between Shenzhen to Guangzhou railway station and Guangzhou East railway station, however, will stay.

Gallery

References

External links

 Shenzhen Railway Station,Luohu Station Shenzhen Metro Overview & History

Shenzhen Metro stations
Railway stations in Shenzhen
Luohu District
Railway stations in China opened in 1911
Stations on the Guangzhou–Shenzhen Railway
Stations on the Beijing–Kowloon Railway